Cacophis churchilli is a species of elapid snake. Its common name is northern dwarf crowned snake. Its range is the wet tropics of Queensland between Townsville and Cooktown.

References

churchilli
Reptiles described in 1985
Snakes of Australia